The National Unification Gas Pipeline (Gas Unificação – GASUN) will be a  natural gas pipeline in Brazil. GASUN will connect the Gasbol pipeline with the northern Amazon and the Northeast states (Pará, Tocantins, Maranhão and Piauí) allowing transportation of Bolivian gas into these regions. The project is expected to cost US$2.48 billion.

The first stage of GASUN will begin in Mimoso, Mato Grosso do Sul, and will join the Gasbol pipeline. From there it will run towards Brasília, passing through Goiânia. Construction of this section started in 2005, and scheduled to be completed in 2007.

It will pass through Palmas and Belém, Pará. The entire natural gas pipeline should be complete by 2026.

References

Natural gas pipelines in Brazil
Proposed pipelines in South America
Energy infrastructure under construction
Proposed energy infrastructure in Brazil